Gnathochromis pfefferi is an African species of fish in the family Cichlidae. It is endemic to Lake Tanganyika and its slow-flowing tributaries in the countries of Burundi, the Democratic Republic of the Congo, Tanzania and Zambia. It is common and widespread. This cichlid is found in relatively shallow waters, typically over soft bottoms in places with aquatic grasses.

It eats invertebrates (especially shrimp) and plant material. Like many other Tanganyika cichlids, it is a mouthbrooder and sometimes kept in aquariums.

Although currently included in the genus Gnathochromis, it is distantly related to the type species G. permaxillaris (tribe Limnochromini), instead being closer to Tropheini. The specific name honours the German zoologist Georg Johann Pfeffer (1854-1931).

References

Gnathochromis
Taxa named by George Albert Boulenger
Fish described in 1898
Fish of Lake Tanganyika
Taxonomy articles created by Polbot